The Long Day Closes is a part song with lyrics by Henry Fothergill Chorley and music by Arthur Sullivan, published in 1868.  This song is one of seven part songs that Sullivan published that year, and it became Sullivan's best-known part song.  Sullivan wrote most of his twenty part songs prior to the beginning of his long collaboration with W. S. Gilbert.

Chorley had also collaborated with Sullivan on other songs, on Sullivan's first (but never-produced) opera, The Sapphire Necklace (completed in 1867), and on a piece for chorus and orchestra, The Masque at Kenilworth (Birmingham Festival, 1864).

With the growth of choral societies during the Victorian era, part songs became popular in Britain (as they had earlier in Germany and elsewhere).  The term "part song" is used here to mean a song written for several vocal parts, usually with the highest part carrying the melody and the other voices supplying accompanying harmonies, rather than one which is contrapuntal like a madrigal.  Part songs are often sung unaccompanied.

The plaintive harmonies of The Long Day Closes and the text's touching meditation on death have made the song a frequent selection at events of mourning, and in particular it was often sung at funerals of members of the D'Oyly Carte Opera Company.  There are at least three recordings of the song, including the instrumental arrangement at the end of the soundtrack of the film Topsy-Turvy called "Resolutions". Terence Davies's 1992 film The Long Day Closes uses a recording of the song by Pro Cantione Antiqua singing the song a cappella.

Lyrics
No star is o'er the lake,
Its pale watch keeping,
The moon is half awake,
Through grey mist creeping,
The last red leaves fall round
The porch of roses,
The clock hath ceased to sound,
The long day closes.

Sit by the silent hearth
In calm endeavour,
To count the sounds of mirth,
Now dumb for ever.
Heed not how hope believes
And fate disposes:
Shadow is round the eaves,
The long day closes.

The lighted windows dim
Are fading slowly.
The fire that was so trim
Now quivers lowly.

Go to the dreamless bed
Where grief reposes;
Thy book of toil is read,
The long day closes, etc.

References

External links
"The Long Day Closes" at The Gilbert and Sullivan Archive
Vocal score at the IMSLP
"The Long Day Closes" at The Gilbert & Sullivan Discography
Information about Sullivan's part songs at The Gilbert and Sullivan Archive
Detailed review of recording of The Long Day Closes
Clip of the song being sung at the 2008 Proms at Royal Albert Hall

Songs about death
Compositions by Arthur Sullivan
1868 songs